The software library wv, also known as wvware or by its previous name mswordview, is a set of free software programs licensed under the GNU General Public License which can be used for viewing and/or converting files in the Microsoft .doc format to plain text, LaTeX, HTML or other formats.

The wv library provides several tools on the command line of a Unix shell, such as wvText for converting a .doc file to a plain text file. It is used by the program abiword, which provides a GUI interface for reading .doc files.

See also
 Antiword

References

External links
 http://wvware.sourceforge.net/

Microsoft Office